Matthew Simmons is a fictional character on the CBS crime drama Criminal Minds: Beyond Borders and Criminal Minds, portrayed by Daniel Henney.

Background and characterization
Simmons is of mixed Caucasian and Korean parentage (like actor Daniel Henney) and it is implied that he was ostracized by his paternal grandparents, who were against his parents' union. His late mother was born in Korea before the Korean War. According to Simmons, she had spent much of her adulthood trying to assimilate and "forget" her past, although she did teach him Korean. He is a native of Carson City, Michigan and worked in Detroit for some time before joining the FBI. He was formerly a member of the FBI's International Response Team (IRT) and has some prior history with Agents Derek Morgan (Shemar Moore) and Jennifer "JJ" Jareau (A.J. Cook) of the FBI's Behavioral Analysis Unit.

When introduced, Simmons and his wife Kristy (Kelly Frye) have four young children: sons Jake and David and twin daughters, Chloe and Lily. In the season 14 finale of Criminal Minds, Kristy revealed to him that she was pregnant with their fifth child, and early in season 15, gives birth to their third daughter, Rose Mary. It was stated in Season 13 of Criminal Minds that the couple have been married for almost ten years. Like Jack Garrett (Gary Sinise), Simmons' full and fulfilling family life was a deliberate choice. Daniel Henney said of his character, "His big struggle is, when can I get home to see my kids and how much is my wife working?".

A United States Army veteran, little is known about Simmons' military service. Simmons is known for his resourcefulness and "always [has] a guy" to turn to for help whenever the team hits a dead end. Like most of the IRT he knows several languages and is shown to be fluent in Arabic, Spanish and Korean. Highly resourceful and adaptable, he thinks quickly on his feet and is often tasked with coordinating search and rescue efforts or navigating unfamiliar terrain.

Simmons has an eclectic variety of interests, ranging from sports to vintage cars. In the episode "Harvested", in which the team investigates a case in Mumbai, India, his knowledge of cricket, India's unofficial national sport, proves useful in building a rapport with the local police officers.

Character arc

In Criminal Minds: Beyond Borders
In the episode "Love Interrupted", Simmons is forced to shoot serial killer Antonio Cayetan (Jonathan Medina) to prevent him from killing his own young daughter in a fit of desperate rage. Cayetan had suffered a breakdown after losing his wife. He then kidnapped newlywed couples, killing and cannibalizing the groom and taking the brides as his "wives", even impregnating them. Simmons later admits to Garrett that the case affected him more than he would like because the girl reminded him of his own daughters.

Simmons and Clara Seger (Alana De La Garza) made an appearance in the Criminal Minds season 12 episode "Spencer" to help out their colleagues at the BAU prove Dr. Spencer Reid's (Matthew Gray Gubler) innocence after he was imprisoned in Mexico after being found in possession of drugs. Simmons and the IRT had been in Costa Rica working a case when they received the call for help.

In the season 2 episode "Pretty Like Me", Simmons takes some time off to fulfill his late mother's dying wish to find her biological mother in her birth country of South Korea. She had been left at an orphanage around the time of the Korean War and moved to the United States at some point with Simmons' father. Because of the disruption and loss of records caused by the war, she was never able to fulfill her wish before her death. Simmons, however, was finally able to track down and meet his grandmother.

In Criminal Minds
Simmons was introduced to Criminal Minds in the backdoor pilot "Beyond Borders" in season 10, in which the IRT is called in to help the BAU with the death of a family overseas. In the season 12 episode "Spencer", he assists the BAU in freeing Spencer Reid (Matthew Gray Gubler) from a Mexican prison and proving his innocence.

In season 13, he is brought in by Technical Analyst Penelope Garcia to help the team after they are ambushed in the field and Agent Emily Prentiss (Paget Brewster) is kidnapped by serial killer Peter Lewis (Bodhi Elfman). When asked what he is doing at the BAU headquarters, Simmons vaguely mentions that he is awaiting a new assignment as the IRT had been dissolved as a result of events in the Criminal Minds: Beyond Borders episode "Blowback" – in which the IRT had been targeted by Assistant Director Linda Barnes (Kim Rhodes), who herself would have the BAU shut down temporarily – and is offered a position on the BAU team by Prentiss by the end of the episode. As he and Jareau are the only two members of the team who are married with children, they often exchange jokes about the mishaps of parenting. In the episode "Ex Parte", Kristy is caught up in a hostage situation at her workplace. The usually calm and collected Simmons nearly strangles the hostage taker to death in a fit of rage but stops when Kristy tells him "It's not you", prompting her husband to let go of the criminal and arrest him instead.

In the season 14 episode "Rule 34", it is revealed that Kristy had been going for therapy due to trauma from the hostage incident. Their son David (Declan Whaley) is suspended from school after physically lashing out at a friend over a comment regarding cop shows. He admits to his parents that his classmate losing her mother brought about fears for his own parents' safety, especially his father's, given the dangerous nature of his job.

Character development and casting
Henney stated that he had accepted the role as it was a departure from Asian stereotypes perpetuated by Hollywood and the American entertainment industry. In an interview with August Man, he described his character as "a really interesting character for an Asian-American actor to play because it's never been done before."

In both shows, Simmons is one of two main characters on the show who is happily married with children, the other being his supervisor Jack Garrett (Gary Sinise) on Criminal Minds: Beyond Borders and Jennifer "JJ" Jareau on Criminal Minds. Showrunner Erica Messer noted that both Matt Simmons and Jack Garrett share similarities and, in conceiving Simmons as a younger agent with both a successful career and family life, hoped "to show that this kind of lifestyle can work".

References

External links
 Matt Simmons on IMDb

Criminal Minds characters
Fictional Federal Bureau of Investigation personnel
Television characters introduced in 2015
Criminal Minds: Beyond Borders
Fictional War in Afghanistan (2001–2021) veterans
Crossover characters in television
American male characters in television